The MUPID (short for "Mehrzweck Universell Programmierbarer Intelligenter Decoder" in German) was an early home computer like system (1981-1983) designed and invented by Hermann Maurer at TU Graz to be used as a Bildschirmtext terminal, but it was also capable of being used as a stand-alone computer.

It had a Zilog Z80 microprocessor and came with BASIC as operating system, 128 KB of RAM, a V.24 1200/75 baud modem, audio input/output for tape recorder, a parallel printer interface and an optional external floppy drive unit. At the time it excelled in having advanced color graphic capabilities.

There were several model variations: MUPID C2D (square case with separate keyboard); MUPID C2D2 (compact case labelled "Komfort MUPID") and MUPID C2A2 (Austrian "Konfort MUPID").

The Mupid was also sold under other brands, as the Grundig PTC 100 (C2D2 variation in a different color) and the Siemens T3110 (C2D variation).

It was followed in 1983 by the MUPID II. This version supported the CEPT Prestel standard, had a better keyboard, a 320 × 240 graphics mode, four voice sound, two DIN6 joystick connectors, a DIN8 tape interface, a DB25 modem, a DE9 serial connector and a DIN8 external disk drive connector.

A card for older IBM PC compatibles with an ISA slot was developed that gave a PC the same graphics capabilities as a MUPID.

References

Home computers
Videotex
Telecommunications in Germany
Z80-based home computers